The 2019 Yale Bulldogs football team represented Yale University in the 2019 NCAA Division I FCS football season. The season marked the Bulldogs's 147th overall season. The team played its home games at the Yale Bowl in New Haven, Connecticut and were led by eighth-year head coach Tony Reno. They were members of the Ivy League. They finished the season 9–1 overall and 6–1 in Ivy League play to share the Ivy League title with Dartmouth. Yale averaged 12,132 fans per game.

Previous season

The Bulldogs finished the 2018 season 5–5, 3–4 in Ivy League play to finish in a three-way tie for fourth place.

Preseason

Preseason media poll
The Ivy League released their preseason media poll on August 8, 2019. The Bulldogs were picked to finish in first place.

Schedule

Roster

Game summaries

Holy Cross

Cornell

Fordham

at Dartmouth

at Richmond

Penn

Columbia

at Brown

at Princeton

Harvard

Ranking movements

References

Yale
Yale Bulldogs football seasons
Ivy League football champion seasons
Yale Bulldogs football